Billy Ed Smith (born July 14, 1953) is an American former professional baseball player and former Major League Baseball second baseman.

Smith was originally drafted in the 3rd round (61st overall) by the California Angels in  out of John Jay High School in San Antonio, TX. He played in their farm system for several years until making his debut early in the 1975 season. That year, he mainly played shortstop, batting just .203 in 59 games.

Smith was signed by the Baltimore Orioles prior to the  season, and in spring training he was chosen to replace Bobby Grich as the Orioles' starting second baseman. As the year went on, however, he lost playing time to rookie Rich Dauer, and he finished 1977 with a batting average of .215 with just 29 RBI in 367 at bats. In , Smith split time with Dauer again, and he boosted his average to .260.

In June, Smith signed a minor league contract with the Philadelphia Phillies, but never made it to the majors for them. He was purchased from the Phillies by the San Francisco Giants in March 1981, but after hitting .180 in 36 games for the Giants his major league career was over.

References

External links

Billy Smith at SABR (Baseball BioProject)

Major League Baseball second basemen
California Angels players
Baltimore Orioles players
San Francisco Giants players
Idaho Falls Angels players
Stockton Ports players
Salinas Packers players
El Paso Sun Kings players
Salt Lake City Angels players
El Paso Diablos players
Salt Lake City Gulls players
Oklahoma City 89ers players
Baseball players from Louisiana
1953 births
Living people